The Maryland Constitution of 1776 was the first of four constitutions under which the U.S. state of Maryland has been governed.  It was that state's basic law from its adoption in 1776 until the Maryland Constitution of 1851 took effect on July 4 of that year.

Background and drafting
In the months before the beginning of the American Revolutionary War, a group of powerful Marylanders formed an association which eventually took the form of a convention in Annapolis. This group made preparations to form a new government for Maryland and sent representatives to participate in the Continental Congress.

The eighth session decided that the continuation of an ad hoc government by the convention was not a good mechanism for governing the state and that a more permanent and structured government was needed. So, on July 3, 1776, they resolved that a new convention be elected that would be responsible for drawing up their first state constitution, one that did not refer to parliament or the king, but would be a government "...of the people only."

On August 1, all freemen with property elected delegates for the Maryland Constitutional Convention of 1776. They began meeting on August 14, drafted the constitution, and adjourned on November 11. The document was not submitted to the people for ratification.  The Assembly of Freemen would not meet again, as it was replaced by the new state government established by the 1776 constitution. Thomas Johnson became the state's first elected governor.

Declaration of Rights

The document included a Declaration of Rights.  This, among other things, ended the position of the Church of England as the state-supported religion, and granted all Christians, including Roman Catholics, freedom of worship. Free blacks who met the property qualifications continued to be eligible to vote.  The declaration was more than a bill of rights, which enunciates certain rights which are reserved to the people.  The declaration stated that all power emanated from the people and that the governors were accountable to the people.

Creation of government 

The 1776 constitution defined the Maryland General Assembly, a bicameral legislature consisting of the Maryland House of Delegates and Maryland State Senate. It acknowledged the power of county governments in administering their own affairs, and called for separate treasurers and land registrars on Maryland's Eastern and Western Shores. The constitution stipulated that new amendments could be passed by two consecutive sessions of the house of delegates.

Elections and the franchise
Despite the declaration that all power emanates from the people, the document kept political power in the hands of the male citizens who met a minimum property requirement. When adopted, the 1776 constitution allowed 20,000 of the 300,000+ people living in Maryland to vote.

Slaves and women could not vote, nor did they have equal rights to men. Only Christians could hold office until 1826, when legislation was adopted allowing Jews to hold office and have equal rights and privileges with Christians.

They directly elected delegates to the Maryland General Assembly and indirectly elected State Senators.  Voters would elect Senatorial Electors every five years.  These men would then meet together to elect a fifteen-member Senate, nine members from the Western Shore and six members from the Eastern Shore. If a Senate vacancy occurred between elections, then the Senate itself selected a replacement. The Governor was elected by the joint legislature, not by the people directly.  And most local offices were appointed by the Governor, with the concurrence of his Executive Council.

Subsequent history
The 1776 constitution was amended 66 times, most notably in 1837, to, among other things, provide for a popularly elected governor, instead of one chosen by the legislature.  The constitution was initially about 8,800 words long.  The several amendments added to it between 1792 and 1846 brought its total length to about 15,200 words.

Black men who met the property requirement could vote until 1810, when the General Assembly ratified a constitutional amendment (approved by the 1809 assembly) to change "freemen" to "free white men" in Article 2 of the constitution.

See also

Government of Maryland
History of Maryland
History of the United States (1776–1789)
List of delegates to the Maryland Constitutional Convention (1776)
Maryland Constitution of 1867
Maryland Constitution of 1864
Maryland Constitution of 1851
State constitution (United States)

References

Bibliography 
Russo, Jean. Maryland Humanities Council (2001). "From Revolution to Revolution: Eighteenth-Century Maryland".
Ridgway, Whitman H. Maryland Humanities Council (2001). "(Maryland) Politics and Law"
 Smith, Herbert C., and John T. Willis. Maryland Politics and Government: Democratic Dominance. University of Nebraska Press, 2012.

External links
Text of the Constitution 
Amendments to the Maryland Constitution of 1776
The Archives of Maryland - Constitutional Records

1776 in American law
Defunct state constitutions of the United States
Maryland law
Maryland in the American Revolution
Legal history of Maryland
1776 in Maryland